The Giardino Botanico e Arboreto Appenninico del Parco Nazionale d'Abruzzo is a botanical garden and arboretum located in the Parco Nazionale d'Abruzzo, Lazio e Molise at via Santa Lucia, 67032 Pescasseroli, Province of L'Aquila, Abruzzo, Italy.

The garden contains about 2,000 species including Arctostaphylos uva-ursi, Daphne mezereum, Juniperus nana, Pinus mugo, Rhamnus pumilus, Rosa pendulina, Salix retusa, Quercus ilex, and Vaccinium myrtillus.

See also 
 List of botanical gardens in Italy

References 
 
 

Botanical gardens in Italy
Gardens in Abruzzo